The 2012 Supercupa României was the 14th edition of Romania's season opener cup competition. The game was contested between Liga I title holders, CFR Cluj, and Romanian Cup winners, Dinamo București. For the first time in history, the Supercup was played at Arena Națională, the newly stadium built in Bucharest.

Dinamo won the game after penalties. After regular time the game ended 1–1 after goals of Diogo Valente, who opened the score for Cluj, and George Țucudean, who equalised in the second half. CFR had their captain Cadú sent off in the 65th minute. In extra time, Țucudean scored again, but CFR answered only one minute later with a goal by Pantelis Kapetanos. At the penalty shootout, two players from CFR missed, only one player from Dinamo failed to score, thus the white-and-reds won the trophy for the second time in history.

Match

Details

References

External links
Romania - List of Super Cup Finals, RSSSF.com

Super
2012
CFR Cluj matches
Supercupa României
Association football penalty shoot-outs